Heysen  may refer to:

People
Hans Heysen, South Australian landscape artist
Nora Heysen, South Australian artist, daughter of Hans

Other
Heysen Trail, a long-distance walking trail in South Australia
Heysen Tunnels, a pair of road tunnels in South Australia
Electoral district of Heysen, an electorate in South Australia